The Union Internationale de Pentathlon Moderne, commonly known by the acronym UIPM, has been the international governing body of modern pentathlon since its foundation in London in 1948. Its headquarters are in Monte-Carlo, Monaco, and it has 115 national federation members.  Modern pentathlon was introduced at the fifth Olympiad in Stockholm, Sweden, in 1912, comprising the contemporary sports of pistol shooting, fencing, swimming, horse riding and running, which embraced the spirit of its ancient counterpart.

UIPM also governs the multi-disciplinary sports Laser Run, Tetrathlon, Biathle, Triathle and World Schools Biathlon, which have been created as development sports aimed at growing global participation rates in UIPM sports and offering more athletes an entry point to modern pentathlon. UIPM is a member of the International Olympic Committee (IOC), the Global Organisation of International Sport Federations (GAISF) and the Federation of International University Sport (FISU), and since joining the International Paralympic Committee it has operated a para-sports programme.

History

The Greek Olympic Games Pentathlon
The Pentathlon (consisting of running the length of the stadium, jumping, throwing the spear, throwing the discus and wrestling) was introduced for the first time at the 18th Olympiad in 708 BC and held a position of unique importance in the Games. It was considered to be the climax, with the winner ranked as "Victor Ludorum". Admiration for the Ancient Pentathlon was fully shared by the founder of the Modern Olympics, Baron Pierre de Coubertin and from 1909 he tried to have the event re-introduced into the Olympic programme. Pentathlon's moment came two years later at the 14th session of the International Olympic Committee (IOC) in Budapest (HUN) when, as the Baron stated: "the Holy Ghost of sport illuminated my colleagues and they accepted a competition to which I attach great importance".

The Modern Pentathlon
Modern Pentathlon was introduced at the fifth Olympiad in Stockholm (SWE) 1912, comprising the contemporary sports of pistol shooting, fencing, swimming, horse riding and running, which embraced the spirit of its ancient counterpart. It was De Coubertin's belief that it would be this event, above all others, that "tested a man's moral qualities as much as his physical resources and skills, producing thereby the ideal, complete athlete." This new sport was enthusiastically adopted with its inherent demands of courage, co-ordination, physical fitness, self-discipline and flexibility in ever changing circumstances. A young American Lieutenant, later to be the famous World War II General, George S. Patton, was to finish fifth in the first Olympic Modern Pentathlon competition. The mixture of physical and mental skills demanded in the Pentathlon has also meant that athletes have been able to compete in as many as three or four Olympic Games. This is because while running and swimming times can be expected to decline with age, experience and skill in the technical disciplines often increase.

Administration of Modern Pentathlon
Modern Pentathlon was administered directly by the IOC until 1948, when the International Modern Pentathlon Union (UIPM) was founded by a group who elected Tor Wibom as the first UIPM president. Gustaf Dyrssen (1920 Olympic champion) from Sweden took over in 1949 with Sven Thofelt serving as secretary general. Thofelt succeeded Dyrssen in 1960 and served as president for 28 years (IOC Member 1970–1976).
In 1960, Biathlon (cross country skiing and rifle shooting) was introduced to the Olympic programme. Biathlon had joined the Union in 1953, and the organization thereafter became the Union Internationale de Pentathlon Moderne et Biathlon (UIPMB). In 1993, an agreement was made to retain as an umbrella body under which the UIPM and the International Biathlon Union (IBU) could act autonomously. The UIPMB however, continued to be the only international multi-sport organisation recognised by the IOC.
Until 1998, the President of Modern Pentathlon acted as President of the Union during the two years prior to the Summer Olympic Games, and the President of the Biathlon acted as such for two years prior to each of the Winter Games. Having matured into an organisation capable of continuing on its own, the IBU decided on 26 June 1998, to exist autonomously. The separation from the UIPMB took effect on 20 August 1998, creating two distinct International Federations – the UIPM and IBU, both of which are recognised by the IOC and GAISF.

Sports development

Biathle
Designed as a 'Sport for All', Biathle has been practised for over 50 years. Through Biathle the UIPM has established a competition composed of the two fundamental components of Modern Pentathlon and most practised sports in the world – run and swim.

The Biathle has universal appeal. It is inexpensive to organise, simple to understand, can be viewed from a single location, and organised practically anywhere in the world at any time of the year. The Biathle competition begins with a pack start of runners who complete one-half of the total running distance before entering a 50-meter transition area. Athletes then dive into the water and swim the required distance before exiting the water, putting on their shoes and running the second leg. The first person to cross the finish line wins. The race distances vary with the age groups concerned. The first Biathle World Championships took place in Monaco in 1999 and the Biathle World Tour started in 2002 to include up to six competitions in various locations throughout the year. Medals are awarded to the top three athletes in each age group in both the World Championships and the World Tour.

World Schools Biathlon
In 2005 UIPM launched a new competition linked to the success of Biathle. The event consists of swimming and running. The swimming discipline is conducted in a 25m or 50m pool and the running discipline is conducted preferably on a standardised track (although it can also be carried out on a flat surface if extra care is taken so that the distances are correct). Swimming is conducted first and running is by mass start. The final result is the sum of the swimming and running points. The originality of the World Schools Biathlon is that schools take part in this international competition by entering their results in a global database using the UIPM website (www.pentathlon.org) directly from their location. Therefore, this competition does not require any funding for transportation or lodging. All can be made 'at home' by the registered physical education teacher or coach.

Triathle
Triathle was officially approved by UIPM in November 2012 as a development sport and, in combination with Biathle, it is an integral part of UIPM sports development. Through Triathle, the UIPM has established a platform to encourage new generations to practise modern pentathlon starting from the basic disciplines of running and swimming and progressing into laser shooting.

Triathle is also very easy to organise and the beach triathle, as performed at the inaugural 2013 World Triathle Championships in Cyprus, has showcased how athletes of all ages can perform in a competition that is delivered with low-cost equipment at no extra cost for the participants.

Triathle normally begins with a pack start of runners for the first 25m, followed by the first series of five shots with the laser pistol. After the next running leg the athletes approach the transition area and swim before finishing with a final running leg. As usual, the first person crossing the finish line will be declared the winner. The race distances vary with the age groups concerned.

Triathle has featured on the Modern Triathle World Tour, the Asian Youth and Asian Beach Games.

The five events

Fencing
Fencing is a series of one-touch bouts with épée swords. The fencing event of modern pentathlon is a round-robin tournament, with a single touch deciding each match. Each competitor has a bout against every other competitor. Bouts last for one minute, the winner being the first fencer to score a hit. If neither scores a hit, both competitors register a defeat, a double hit, doesn't count. Point penalties are awarded for a variety of infringements including hitting the épée on anything other than the opponent to register to a hit, crossing the boundary line with both feet or to avoid a hit, dangerous play and when a fencer turns their back on the opponent. Seventy percent of bouts won correspond to 1000 pentathlon points. Each win is called a victory and each loss a defeat. Each victory over or under the 70% mark is worth a specific point value and this number is in accordance with the number of competitors:

 22–23 bouts gives +/- 40 points
 24–26 bouts gives +/- 36 points
 27–29 bouts gives +/- 32 points
 30–33 bouts gives +/- 28 points
 34–39 bouts gives +/- 24 points

Example: 36 competitions (the number of athletes in a final) means 35 bouts, 70% of 35 bouts = 25 victories = 1000 points, 23 victories are therefore worth 952 Pentathlon points.

Swimming
Pentathletes usually have a swimming background, which is considered to be the only pentathlon discipline that cannot be taught at a higher level at an older age. For this reason, good swimming standards are considered to be a "precondition" for participation in Modern Pentathlon. A time of 2:30 earns 1000 Pentathlon points. Every 0.33 seconds is worth +/- 4 points and thus the value of each swimming second is worth 12 points. Example: the time 2:32.66 minutes corresponds to 968 points. Forty point penalties are incurred for a false start, failing to touch the wall at the end of a lap or leaving the pool in an incorrect manner as stipulated in the rules.

Riding
Athletes compete on horses provided by the organisers, which are selected from a random draw. For warm-up and preparation purposes, athletes are allowed to ride their allocated horse for 20 minutes and to have up to five trial jumps in the warm-up arena provided. Pentathletes are given 20 minutes to inspect the course at any time during the competition programme according to the organiser's schedule. The athlete has a specific time limit in which to complete the course, and the time limit is set according to its length. A clear round in time allowed (varies between 1 minute and 1.17 minutes) gives the rider 1200 pentathlon points. For each mistake the rider loses points. Examples of penalties given are 20 points for knock-down and 40 points for every refusal or disobedience: but any disobedience leading to the knocking down of an obstacle gives 60 points deduction. After two refusals to jump, the rider must try to jump the next obstacle. A fall of the rider from the horse or if they both fall is a 60-point penalty. After two falls, the riding will be terminated. In case of riding terminations for every obstacle not jumped, the rider loses 100 points. The most common cases of riding terminations are: Wrong course, second fall, exceeding the time limit that is double of the time allowed and retiring from the competition.

Each second over the time limit means a deduction of four points.  The maximum time is the double of the standard time. If the rider is slower than the time allowed, the riding is terminated Riders must jump the obstacles in order. Riders must wear protective headgear and a riding jacket and can use a whip and spurs: Horses hoods and blinkers are prohibited.

Laser Run
In 2008, the UIPM Congress passed a motion to change the competition format of the modern pentathlon to combine the shoot and run disciplines. This is now known as the "Laser Run" and is the final event of the day's competition. In the individual competition for men and women at Senior, Junior and Youth A levels, athletes start with a handicap start, approximately  run, to a shooting range where they are required to hit five targets (time limit 50 seconds) before beginning an  run. This is repeated three further times for a total of 20 targets and  run. Two thousand (2000) pentathlon points are awarded for a time of 12.30 minutes. Each second faster or slower than the prescribed time is worth ±4 points.

The laser-run is also included in relay competitions in teams of two or three pentathletes. However, the format differs slightly in that only two series of the course are repeated (five targets down (time limit 50 seconds for youth);  run; five targets down (time limit 50 seconds for youth);  run) for each of the pentathletes. For team of three athletes, 2000 points are awarded for a time 25.00 minutes. Each second faster or slower than the prescribed time is worth +/-4 points. For team of two athletes, 2000 points are awarded for a time 17.00 minutes. Each second faster or slower than the prescribed time is worth +/-4 points.

The shooting competition is in four series; each series consists of hitting five targets with an unlimited number of shots in a maximum time of 50 seconds on a target of dimension . If after 50 seconds, one or more targets have not been hit (or the athlete did not hit five times the valid zone), the pentathlete can start on the running leg without being penalised. After the first leg, the pentathletes return to their shooting stations, where they must reset their target, (only the pentathlete is authorised to reset their target) and then start the second shooting series that consists of hitting five targets using an unlimited number of shots but in the time limit of 50 seconds.

The laser-run uses electronic targets which consist of one black single aim and five green/red lamps indicators.

List of presidents
 Gustaf Dyrssen (1948–1960)
 Sven Thofelt (1960–1988)
 Igor Novikov (1988–1992)
 Klaus Schormann (1992–present)

Modern Pentathlon competitions

Olympic Games

From 1912 to 1980 the Olympic Modern Pentathlon competition was held over five days with one event per day. Between 1984 and 1992, the competition was held over four days with either running and shooting or swimming and shooting on the same day. For the Atlanta Olympic Games in 1996, the competition was a one-day event in which 32 men who qualified via pre-Olympic competitions participated. In 1998, the UIPM received approval for women to compete in the Sydney 2000 Olympic Games and so 24 men and 24 women competed in individual competition and for the first time in history, the Pentathlon venues were 96% sold out. UIPM subsequently received an increase in the quota and in Athens 2004, 32 men and 32 women competed and both competitions were 100% sold-out. Following this success, UIPM received in February 2006 a further increase in quota from the IOC Executive Board – in Beijing 2008 Olympic Games, 36 men & 36 Women took part in the Olympic Modern Pentathlon event. The same quota has also been confirmed for the 2012 London Olympic Games. In the 2020 Tokyo Olympic Games there was controversy when a number of horses refused to comply during the horse jumping stage in the event.

World championships

Senior, Junior and Under 19 World Championships (formerly known as Youth A) take place annually, with male and female athletes competing in individual, team and relay events. From 2018 the Senior World Championships will be renamed as the UIPM Pentathlon World Championships. The Junior category is for pentathletes aged 23 and under, while the Under 19 World Championships is the only one that adopts the Tetrathlon format, where riding is omitted. Athletes compete in qualification groups for the right to take part in the final, which can include up to 36 athletes. Individual medals and prize money are awarded as well as team medals which are decided by adding the top three individual team members' scores together. Relay events involve two athletes competing in turn throughout the various disciplines. A mixed relay has been included since 2009 in all World Championships and World Cups, and the Youth Olympic Games mixed relay uniquely gives athletes from different countries the opportunity to compete for medals in unison.

 World Modern Pentathlon Championships
 World Junior Modern Pentathlon Championships
 World Youth Modern Pentathlon Championships
 World U24 Modern Pentathlon Championships
 World Masters Modern Pentathlon Championships
 World Para Modern Pentathlon Championships
 Biathle and Triathle World Championships
 Biathle and Triathle World Tours
 World Laser Run Championships

Pentathlon World Cup 

A World Cup series for both men and women has been organised since 1990. Each year, between 4 and 6 World Cup competitions and a World Cup Final are organised, and the whole package is called the World Cup, renamed in 2018 as the UIPM Pentathlon World Cup. The best 36 athletes qualify for the World Cup Final via a league table constructed from their three best results at World Cup competitions. Prize money is also available.

Continental championships 
Continental championships are organised by the Confederations of UIPM: Africa, Asia, Europe, Oceania, South America and NORCECA (North America, Central America and Caribbean).

 European Modern Pentathlon Championships from 1987.
 African Modern Pentathlon Championships from 2001.
 Asian & Oceanian Modern Pentathlon Championships from 1986.
 Pan American Modern Pentathlon Championships from 1951.

Athletes
See :Category:Modern pentathletes by nationality

Olympic Pentathletes
See :Category:Olympic modern pentathletes

See also 
 List of shooting sports organizations

References

External links 
 
 UIPMtv.org / Live Streaming of World Cup Events

 
Modern pentathlon
Shooting sports organizations
Sports organizations established in 1948